The Malaysia International Islamic Financial Centre (MIFC) is an initiative of Malaysia’s financial market regulators and relevant government agencies dedicated to developing Malaysia’s Islamic finance market by engaging with industry and government. The initiative was launched in 2006 and is based in Kuala Lumpur, Malaysia.

The MIFC is supported by Bank Negara Malaysia, Securities Commission Malaysia, Labuan Financial Services Authority, and Bursa Malaysia. The MIFC’s private sector partners include Islamic banks, conventional banks with Islamic banking windows, investment banks, brokers, lawyers, Shariah advisory firms, Shariah scholars, accounting and tax advisers, ratings agencies and takaful providers.

Malaysia World's Islamic Finance Marketplace
Islamic finance in Malaysia has developed into a comprehensive and sophisticated Islamic finance marketplace. The marketplace is characterised by a robust regulatory, supervisory, Shariah and legal framework, a deep primary market and active secondary sukuk market, a diverse players and talent base with global capabilities and connectivity for business deals anywhere in the world, product innovation, breadth and depth and an efficient system for multi-currency clearing and settlement.

Malaysia’s Islamic finance marketplace is open to global industry players and market participants to collaborate with and mutually benefit from a highly conducive business environment of innovation, expertise and deal flow.

The marketplace
Malaysia is strategically located at the heart of Association of Southeast Asian Nations (ASEAN), a region that pulses with a population of over 600 million, total GDP of more than USD2 trillion, total trade of USD2.5 trillion and with total FDI of USD108 billion. Being located in ASEAN, one of the world’s fastest growing regions, has attracted a thriving community of participants in the global Islamic finance industry. This has resulted in an integrated, end-to-end marketplace that has been recognised as a global destination for expertise, innovation and deal flow.

Malaysia is a fast-growing economy whose liberal market policies are aimed at promoting trade, entrepreneurship, industrial and economic development. Initiatives undertaken by the Malaysian Government and the private sector have always been investor-centric and business friendly with the aim of encouraging market development. This has transformed Malaysia into one of the most dynamic business environments in Southeast Asia.

Characteristics of The marketplace
 Robust regulatory, supervisory, Shariah and legal framework
 Efficient and transparent price discovery platform
 Deep primary market and active secondary trading of instruments
 Diverse players and talent base with global capabilities and connectivity
 Product breadth and depth, attractive to global investors and issuers
 Efficient settlement system that allow settlement and clearing in RM, USD, and RMB

Internationalising Sukuk Market
Malaysia remained the key issuer accounting for 69.3% or USD19.73bln of the total quarterly issuance. Cumulatively in 3Q14 YTD, Malaysia represents 64.9% of total issuances this year to date with more than USD61.4bln in new issuances volume, an increase of 6% in absolute volume compared to the USD58.2bln issued in the same period last year.

The Malaysian sukuk market has been tapped by a wide variety of issuers including benchmark sukuk of various maturities issued by the Malaysian central bank; capital raising and liquidity management sukuk issued by various Malaysian corporate institutions; infrastructure and fund-raising sukuk by the Malaysian government-related entities such as Pengurusan Air SPV Berhad; retail sukuk issued by Dana Infra giving Shariah-compliant capital market fixedincome investment opportunities to individuals; and also by foreign issuers such as Bumitama Agri from Singapore that have issued sukuk in the Malaysian capital markets.

Sukuk were also issued denominated in foreign currencies including the world’s first Japanese Yen sukuk. Overall, a total of 114 sukuk tranches were domiciled in the Malaysian sukuk market in 3Q14.

The "Emas" designation is given to foreign-currency denominated sukuk issues. "Emas", which means gold in Bahasa Malaysia symbolized universal value and security.

Growing Islamic Banking and Takaful Sectors
The Malaysian Islamic financial sector continues its growth trajectory, with robust growth in Islamic banking assets and takaful assets. The Islamic Banking sector in Malaysia has witnessed an increased market share on the back of growing demand for Islamic financial services.

Islamic banking has grown twice as fast in Malaysia as its conventional counterpart at a compounded annual growth rate of 22%, representing 24% to 25%% of total banking system.

The country is domicile to 11 takaful operators, two of which are foreign owned. The rate of growth in the takaful industry has been gaining traction to become one of the main segments of the country's insurance sector.

Retakaful operators in Malaysia add an extra layer of depth to the takaful industry through the spreading of risk and added capacity so that more risk can be underwritten.

Vibrant and Innovative Islamic Equity Market
Malaysia’s Islamic finance marketplace has an efficient and transparent price discovery infrastructure. Fund raising and investment activities in the Islamic capital market adhere to Islamic principles. Islamic equity market products in Malaysia include Shariah-compliant equities, Shariah-compliant collective investment schemes (unit trust funds, wholesale funds, I-REITs, I-ETFs), structured products, alternative funds(real estate, leasing, commodities) private equity funds and mixed asset (equity + fixed income + cash).

73% of total listed securities on Bursa Malaysia are Shariah-compliant. The updated list of Shariah-compliant securities approved by its Shariah Advisory Council (SAC), which takes effect on 30 May 2014, features a total of 665 Shariah-compliant securities.

Malaysia had different asset classed to suit various investor needs. The industry in Malaysia grew from two Shariah-compliant unit trust funds in 1993 to more than 220 approved funds. Malaysia’s Islamic fund management industry with RM97.5bil in assets under management, is managed by 20 asset management companies licensed to exclusively manage shariah-compliant funds. Of the total assets under management, RM42bil is in the form of syariah-compliant unit trust funds which grew by 21% in 2013.

Talent Development - Sustaining the growth of Islamic Finance
The growth of Islamic finance in the past decade has been extraordinary. As the industry expands into untapped markets, there is a need to develop new talent that understands the industry and its underlying Shariah principles to support this growth. In response, Malaysia has undertaken initiatives to support the development of a highly skilled Islamic finance human capital workforce.

MIFC Executive Committee
The MIFC Executive Committee (MIFC EXCO), made up of senior industry and government figures, provides strategic direction to MIFC through policy review and role assignment powers. . The MIFC Promotions Unit serves as a liaison between investors, issuers, investment and Islamic banks, tertiary education institutions and the MIFC.

MIFC communications campaigns
The MIFC Promotions Unit has implemented three communications campaigns since its launch in 2006.
 The first, “Islamic finance meets in Malaysia” promoted Malaysia as a destination for companies and sovereigns looking to raise funds to meet with investors looking to put excess funds to work.
 The second, “Shaping Islamic finance together” emphasised Malaysia’s role within the world as a collaborative partner in Islamic finance, showcasing Malaysia’s well developed regulatory framework and talent development institutions.
 The third and current campaign “Malaysia: World’s Islamic Finance Marketplace” demonstrate the comprehensive and robust nature of Malaysia’s Islamic finance market. The marketplace is made up of the Islamic capital market, Islamic banking, Islamic money market, takaful and retakaful, Islamic fund management, talent development and professional ancillary services.

References

2006 establishments in Malaysia
Islamic economic jurisprudence
Business organisations based in Malaysia
International organisations based in Malaysia
Bursa Malaysia